The Batalle of la Loma was a minor engagement of the Second French intervention in Mexico which took place on 16 July 1865 in the vicinity of Hacienda de la Loma in the current municipality of Tacámbaro, Michoacán. The battle occurred members of the Mexican Republican army, led by General Porfirio Díaz, and the Belgian Legion, supporting French and Mexican Imperial troops, led by Lieutenant Colonel Alfred Van der Smissen. Despite the Belgian victory, the Mexican mission was highly expensive for Belgium because just half of 1,500 soldiers sent to Mexico returned to Europe at the end of the war.

References 

Battles of the Second French intervention in Mexico
la Loma
1865 in Mexico
1865 in the French colonial empire
La Loma
La Loma
History of Michoacán
July 1865 events